Carex aequialta is a tussock-forming perennial in the family Cyperaceae, that is native to north eastern parts of Asia.

See also
 List of Carex species

References

aequialta
Plants described in 1909
Taxa named by Georg Kükenthal
Flora of China
Flora of Japan
Flora of Korea